The New York City Department of Transportation (NYCDOT) is the agency of the government of New York City responsible for the management of much of New York City's transportation infrastructure. Ydanis Rodriguez is the Commissioner of the Department of Transportation, and was appointed by Mayor Eric Adams on January 1, 2022. Former Commissioners have included Polly Trottenberg, Janette Sadik-Khan, and Iris Weinshall. Their Training Center is located at 140 General R W Berry Dr, Queens, NY 11359, off of Exit 32 of the Cross Island Expressway.

Responsibilities
The Department of Transportation's responsibilities include day-to-day maintenance of the city's streets, highways, bridges, sidewalks, street signs, traffic signals, and street lights. DOT supervises street resurfacing, pothole repair, parking meter installation and maintenance, and municipal parking facility management. DOT also operates the Staten Island Ferry. DOT is the exclusive provider of day-to-day operations and maintenance on state-maintained roads and highways in city limits, while major repairs and capital improvements on state-owned roads are performed by the State DOT (NYSDOT). Both DOT and NYSDOT reserve the right to install signage, signals, and other roadway features on state highways, which then become maintained on a daily basis by DOT. DOT sets the speed limit on all roads and highways in the city, including those owned by NYSDOT.

DOT is also responsible for oversight of transportation-related issues, such as authorizing jitney van services and permits for street construction. DOT also advocates for transportation safety issues, including promotion of pedestrian and bicycle safety.

Its regulations are compiled in title 34 of the New York City Rules.

Traffic and street lights
The first traffic lights in New York City originated from traffic towers installed along Fifth Avenue in Manhattan in the 1910s. The first such towers were installed in 1920 and were replaced in 1929 by bronze traffic signals. , the DOT oversaw 12,460 intersections citywide with traffic lights. By 2017, the DOT controlled nearly 13,000 signalized intersections, almost all of which had pedestrian signals; of these, over half (7,507) had countdown timers for pedestrians. In addition, 635 signalized intersections under the DOT's control had exclusive pedestrian phases .

, the DOT maintained 548 accessible pedestrian signals for blind and visually impaired pedestrians. The first such signals were installed in 1957, but few accessible signals were added for the next half-century. In 2021, a federal judge ruled that the DOT had to install accessible signals at 9,000 intersections; the DOT plans to install these signals through 2031. All remaining intersections are planned to have accessible signals by 2036.

The DOT maintains 250,000 streetlamps . Most of them are LED lamps, installed between 2013 and 2018.

One of the larger groups of traffic restrictions implemented by the DOT is in Midtown Manhattan, where the DOT maintains a system of "thru streets" and split traffic-signal phases to prevent congestion on west-east streets.

Organization

Commissioner of Transportation
First Deputy Commissioner
Sidewalk Inspection and Management
Staten Island Ferry Service
Bridges
Transportation Planning & Management
Roadway Repair and Maintenance
Information Technology and Telecommunications
Borough Commissioners
Brooklyn Borough Commissioner
Manhattan Borough Commissioner
Bronx Borough Commissioner
Queens Borough Commissioner
Staten Island Borough Commissioner
Policy
External Affairs
Finance, Contracting, and Program Management
Human Resources and Facilities Management
Legal

Management and budget
As of 2017, DOT had the budget and staff as follows:

Bridges
The DOT operates 794 roadway and pedestrian bridges throughout New York City, including 25 movable bridges. The agency's portfolio includes most of the East River and Harlem River bridges, as well as smaller bridges throughout the city. DOT operates two retractable bridges (the Borden Avenue and Carroll Street bridges). Other agencies that operate road bridges in New York include the MTA, the PANYNJ, and the NYSDOT.

East River bridges:
Brooklyn Bridge                                             
Manhattan Bridge                                          
Williamsburg Bridge                                  
Queensboro Bridge                                       
Roosevelt Island Bridge
Wards Island Bridge

Harlem River bridges:
Willis Avenue Bridge
Third Avenue Bridge
Madison Avenue Bridge
145th Street Bridge
Macombs Dam Bridge
Washington Bridge
University Heights Bridge
Broadway Bridge

See also
 New York City Office of Administrative Trials and Hearings (OATH), for hearings conducted on summonses for quality of life violations issued by the Department
 New York State Department of Transportation
Metropolitan Transportation Authority, for the state agency responsible for public transportation in the NYC metropolitan area

References

External links

 Department of Transportation in the Rules of the City of New York
 NYC DOT Real Time Traffic Information

Transportation
Department of Transportation
Air pollution in New York City